Reales de Puebla Futbol Club is a Mexican football club that plays in the Liga TDP. The club is based in Puebla, Puebla.

History
The club was founded in 2006  by Abel Nava along with avier Aquino Limón and an ex Candide to the municipal presidency  José Amador Tejeda Carbajal. These men made up the directors' board who stated that they planned on having a club in the 4th and second division via promotion or by buying a franchise. The club currently plays in group 4 of the Tercera División de México.

Roster

See also
Football in Mexico

External links
terceradivision.com.mx

References 

Football clubs in Puebla
Association football clubs established in 2006
2006 establishments in Mexico